Festival city may refer to:

 Adelaide, The Festival City, City of Food & Wine,  South Australia.
 Cedar City, Utah
 Dubai Festival City, residential, business and entertainment development in the city of Dubai.
 Edmonton, Alberta, Canada
 Festival City, a private housing estate in Hong Kong
 Ottawa, Ontario, Canada
. Milwaukee,  Wisconsin